See also Serua (disambiguation)
Serua is one of Fiji's fourteen Provinces. Its 830 square kilometers occupy the southernmost areas of Viti Levu, being one of 8 provinces based on Fiji's largest island. It had a population of 15,461 at the 2007 census.

According to a report by David Wilkinson an interpreter and advisor to Sir Arthur Hamilton-Gordon, 1st Baron Stanmore, 1st, Governor of Fiji, the region was one of the least stable regions of Fiji before cession in 1874. It led to the secession of the western part of the province into the neighbouring province of Nadroga-Navosa in 1916.

Serua is part of the Burebasaga confederacy. The traditional head of the province is titled the Vunivalu of Korolevu and is based on the tiny island of Serua (to which the province is named after) just off the coast of the province.

Serua includes Nuku District and three non-contiguous pieces of Serua District,Deuba and Batiwai  all separated by Nuku.

The province is governed by a Provincial Council, chaired by Taito Nakalevu based in the nearest township of Navua.

Prominent people from Serua includes former executive of Telecom Fiji Limited (TFL) Taito Tabaleka,former Fiji government consultant Pio Tabaiwalu, Kele Leawere, netball players Matila WaqanidrolaVilimaina Davu and Former member of Senate, Former Minister of Primary Industries, former Minister of Defense and Immigration Joketani Cokanasiga.

Places of interest in the province include the Pacific Novitiate at Lomeri Pacific Harbour and Deuba beach.

References

Sources
Population Censuses and Surveys

 
Serua
Serua